Events in the year 1867 in India.

Incumbents
Sir John Lawrence, Governor-General of India, 12 January 1864 – 12 January 1869
Colonel Henry Errington Longden, Adjutant-General of India, January 1866–March 1869
Lord Napier, Governor of Madras, 1866-1872
Chhatar Sal Singh II, Maharao of Kota State, 27 March 1866 – 11 June 1889
Sagramji II Devaji (Sagramji Bhanabhai), Thakur of Gondal State, 1851-14 December 1869
Bham Pratap Singh, Raja and Maharajah of Bijawar State, 23 November 1847 – 15 September 1899
Shri Singh, Raja of Chamba State, 1844-1870
Ranmalsinhji Amarsinhji, Raj Sahib of Dhrangadhra State, 9 April 1843 – 16 October 1869
Madan Pal, Maharaja of Karauli State, 4 March 1854 – 16 August 1869
Pratap Singh Deo, Maharajah of Patna, 1866-1878
Afzal ad-Dawlah, Asaf Jah V, Nizam of Hyderabad, 16 May 1857 – 26 February 1869
Ram Singh I, Raja of Sitamau State, 1802-1867
Bhawani Singh, Raja of Sitamau State, 1867-28 May 1885
Khem Savant IV "Bapu Sahib" Bhonsale, Raja Bahadur of Sawantwadi State, 3 October 1812 – 1867
Phond Savant IV "Bapu Sahib" Bhonsale, Raja Bahadur of Sawantwadi State, 1867-7 March 1869
William Reierson Arbuthnot, member of the Madras Legislative Council, 1866-1870

Events
Hindus in the United Provinces of Agra and Oudh demanded that Hindi be made an official language in place of Urdu.
Urdu/Hindi Controversy.
The central government switches from a May–April fiscal year to an April–March one to align with that of the British government.
British Indian soldiers participate in the British Expedition to Abyssinia from 1867 to 1868
Jesuits destroy the ruins of the Chudamani Vihara
British soldiers mounted the Andaman Islands Expedition, landing on Little Andaman on 21 March
Prarthana Samaj, a movement for religious and social reform in Bombay, was founded
Administration of the Press and Registration of Books Act, 1867 was passed
Dadabhai Naoroji established the East India Association, one of the predecessor organisations of the Indian National Congress
Henry Miers Elliot's The History of India, as Told by Its Own Historians is published in London from 1867 to 1877
Ohel David Synagogue was constructed in Pune by David Sassoon
Sassoon Hospital was built in Pune by David Sassoon
St. Vincent's High School was established in Pune
Sribati G.K. High School was established
Balmer Lawrie manufacturing company was founded in Calcutta
Madras Boat Club, one of the oldest rowing centres in India, was founded
Balaghat district was constituted
Buldhana district was constituted
Ellichpur District was constituted
Daulatpur Mohsin High School was founded
Great Indian Peninsula Railway's Allahabad-Jubbulpore branch line was opened in June
Jogeshwari railway station was opened
Mahalaxmi railway station was opened
BB&CI, the first suburban railway, opened

Law
Murderous Outrages Regulation
Public Gambling Act of 1867 is passed, prohibiting the running or being in charge of a public gaming house
Press & Registration Of Books Act
Portuguese Civil Code
Oriental Gas Company Act

Births
Bruce McRae, American stage and early silent film actor, on 15 January
Champat Rai Jain, founder of the Jain mission in London, is born on 6 August in Delhi
Harry Bard, secretary of the Pan American Society of the United States, on 27 August
M. V. Dhurandhar, painter and postcard artist, born in Kolhapur, Maharashtra
Mahashankar Vishwanath Thaker, Chief Treasurer of the Princely State of Limbdi under Jhala Rajput rule, born in Wadhwan, Gujarat
Edward Vere Levinge, administrator in the Indian Civil Service who rose to serve as acting Lieutenant-Governor of the British Raj, born on 24 May in Cuttack
Sankaradas Swamigal, Tamil writer, actor, playwright, songwriter and drama producer, born in Tuticorin
Maud Diver, English author who wrote novels, short stories, biographies and journalistic pieces, born on 9 September in Murree
 Jain Spiritual Saint, Philosopher and Poet Shrimad RajchandraJi was Born in Vavania, Gujarat on 09thNovember 1967

Deaths
Ram Singh I, Raja of Sitamau State, 1867
Khem Savant IV "Bapu Sahib" Bhonsale, Raja Bahadur of Sawantwadi State

References

 
India
Years of the 19th century in India